Hedgehog's Home is a Canadian-Croatian short stop-motion animated film, directed by Bosnian Croat Eva Cvijanović and released in 2017. Based on a short children's story by Bosnian-Serbian-Yugoslavian writer Branko Ćopić, the film's character is a hedgehog defending his home from a fox, a bear, a wolf and a wild boar. It is a co-production between Bonobostudio of Croatia and National Film Board of Canada.

The film is narrated by Kenneth Welsh in English, France Castel in French and Rade Šerbedžija in Croatian.

The film was a Canadian Screen Award nominee for Best Animated Short Film at the 6th Canadian Screen Awards, a Prix Iris nominee for Best Animated Film at the 20th Quebec Cinema Awards, and an Annie Award nominee for Best Animated Short Subject at the 45th Annie Awards. It was submitted to the 2018 Academy Awards for the Academy Award for Best Animated Short Film, but was not selected as a finalist.

The film was rated 4.8 out of 5 by Indie Shorts Mag and stated that Hedgehog’s Home is a film that'll appeal to a wide range of viewers, regardless of age. Straightforward and simple as the film is, plenty is up for interpretation and the story has much room to accommodate them.

References

External links
 
 Hedgehog's Home at the National Film Board of Canada

2017 animated films
2017 films
2017 short films
2010s animated short films
English-language Canadian films
National Film Board of Canada animated short films
Croatian animated short films
French-language Canadian films
2010s English-language films
2010s Canadian films